Changanassery Smaraka Granthasala is one of the oldest libraries in Iverkala, Kerala, India, and is affiliated with Kerala Granthasala Sangham. It is number four in the ghrantha salasangham register. The library was started by Changanassery Parameswaran Pillai, a social reformer in the Kingdom of Travancore in the 19th century. This is the first library in the surrounding panchayaths. It also serves as a social convention centre in the village.

Education in Kollam district
Libraries in Kerala